Jason Holstrom (born August 3, 1976) is a Seattle-based musician and member of Seattle bands United State of Electronica (U.S.E.) and Wonderful.

His solo projects include  The Thieves of Kailua,  Tonight Sky and Sunstrom Sound Solar Cycle, a series of ambient albums following the earth's seasonal path around the sun. In 2012 he created music for the This American Life Live show, including the score for the Mike Birbiglia short film Fresh Air 2: 2 Fresh 2 Furious.

Discography

Wonderful
 Welcome to Wonderful, Wonderful (2001) — bass guitar, electronic keyboards, vocals
 God Bless Our Pad, Wonderful (2003) — bass guitar, keyboards, guitar, saxophone, vocals, recording, production, mixing
 Wake Up to Dreamland, Wonderful (2011) — bass, vocals, co production, mixing, engineering.

U.S.E
 U.S.E., United State of Electronica (2004) — guitar, vocals, keyboards, ukulele, production, engineering, mixing, mastering
 Party People EP, United State of Electronica (2005) — guitar, vocals, engineering, mixing, mastering
 LOVEWORLD, U.S.E. (2009) — guitar, vocals, co production, mixing, engineering.

Solo
 The Thieves of Kailua (2007) —  writing, performing, production, engineering, mixing.
 Tonight Sky, (2013)  -- writing, production, engineering, mixing.
 Vernal, Sunstrom Sound (2015) -- composition, production.
 Estival, Sunstrom Sound (2015) -- composition, production.
 Autumnal, Sunstrom Sound (2015) -- composition, production.
 Hibernal, Sunstrom Sound (2015) -- composition, production.
 CABANALIVE 9-22-16, Sunstrom Sound (2018) -- composition, production, live mixing.
 STORMSPACE, Sunstrom Sound (2021) -- Composition, production, mastering.

Production - Other Artists
 Suburbiac, Dolour (2002) - saxophone on "Chasing the Wrong Girl Home"
 New Old Friends, Dolour (2004) — ukulele, vocals, saxophone, engineering, mixing
 Tomorrow's Taken, Ian McGlynn (2004) — mixing, mastering
 Blow Up, Kandy Whales (2004) — engineering, mixing, mastering
 MP3, Mister Pleasant (Josh Ottum) (2004) — mixing, mastering
 I Sold Gold, Aqueduct (2005) — guitar, engineering, mixing
 Pistols at Dawn (EP), Aqueduct (2004) — guitar, engineering, mixing
 Or Give Me Death, Aqueduct (2007) — co-production, engineering, mixing, guitar, vocals
 The Years in the Wilderness, Dolour (2007) — mixing, engineering, bass guitar, vocals
 It's Alright EP, Josh Ottum (2007) — mastering
 Who Left the Lights On EP (Europe), Josh Ottum (2007) — mastering
 I'm Gonna Live the Life I Sing About in My Song Shane Tutmarc & the Traveling Mercies (2007) — mixing, mastering
 Hey Lazarus! Shane Tutmarc & The Traveling Mercies (2008) - mixing, mastering
 Rising From Ashes Score, Joshua Myers (2012) -- additional composition, engineering.
 2 Fresh 2 Furious, from This American Life Live. (2012) score, production.
 Christmas With My Baby, Dolour (2017) - ukulele, engineering.
 Side You Play (Sunstrom Sound Remix)'', Subways on the Sun (2018) - Remixing, synthesizers.

See also 
 United State of Electronica
 Wonderful
 Aqueduct
 Sunstrom Sound
 Music of Seattle
 Dolour

References

External links 
 Mannheim Worldwide — full-length albums for download
 Official website of The Thieves Of Kailua

American rock guitarists
American male guitarists
Living people
Musicians from Seattle
1976 births
Guitarists from Washington (state)
21st-century American guitarists
21st-century American male musicians